Tyler Bozak (born March 19, 1986) is a Canadian professional ice hockey centre who is currently a free agent. He most recently played for the St. Louis Blues of the National Hockey League (NHL). Bozak has also previously played for the Toronto Maple Leafs. Prior to being signed by the Maple Leafs as a free agent, Bozak had played two seasons at the University of Denver in the National Collegiate Athletic Association (NCAA). In 2018, after nine seasons with the Maple Leafs, Bozak signed with the Blues in free agency. In his first season with the Blues, Bozak won the Stanley Cup, defeating the Boston Bruins in 2019.

Playing career

Amateur
Bozak started playing in the British Columbia Hockey League (BCHL) for the Victoria Salsa in the 2004–05 season, after unsuccessful training camps at the top tier junior league, the Western Hockey League (WHL) level. He spent three seasons in the BCHL with the Victoria franchise. In his final season, Bozak recorded 128 points (45 goals and 83 assists), and was awarded the Brett Hull Trophy as the BCHL's top scorer.

On December 11, 2006, the University of Denver Pioneers announced that Bozak had signed a letter of intent to play hockey for the school. He joined the Pioneers for the 2007–08 season. During his freshman year with the team, Bozak played in all 41 games and led the team in scoring with 34 points (18 goals and 16 assists). He was second in the country with five shorthanded goals. During the season, Bozak was named the Red Baron Western Collegiate Hockey Association (WCHA) Rookie of the Week four times and was named the Hockey Commissioner's Association (HCA) Rookie of the Month for December. At the end of the season, Bozak was named to the All-WCHA third team and to the All-WCHA Rookie Team.

Heading into his sophomore season with the Pioneers, Bozak was named to the College Hockey News Preseason All-America Team.  On December 12, he tore the meniscus in his left knee in a game against the Minnesota State Mavericks, causing him to miss more than half of the Pioneers' season.  After the season, Bozak was named to the All-WCHA Academic Team.

Professional

Toronto Maple Leafs
After his sophomore season, Bozak was a heavily pursued free agent despite never being drafted by an NHL team. On April 3, 2009, he signed a two-year, entry-level contract with the Toronto Maple Leafs. Exact financial details of the contract were not released, but it has been rumoured to be worth close to $4 million per season if all performance bonuses were to be reached. After signing, Bozak did not play for the Leafs during the remainder of the 2008–09 season, instead taking the time to further rehabilitate his injured knee.

Bozak attended the Maple Leafs' training camp prior to the 2009–10 season. He had a strong training camp, though due to salary cap constraints, he was sent down to the Leafs' American Hockey League (AHL) affiliate, the Toronto Marlies. Then-Maple Leafs head coach Ron Wilson admitted that Bozak indeed had a strong camp, stating, "He'll probably have to go down because of numbers. Based on the way he played in training camp, he's certainly worthy of playing in the NHL, but we may not have room at the beginning." Bozak was eventually recalled on October 13, 2009, and made his NHL debut the same night against the Colorado Avalanche. During the game, he recorded his first NHL point, an assist on a goal scored by defenceman François Beauchemin. After playing one game for Toronto, Bozak was returned to the Marlies on October 15. Later in the season, on January 12, 2010, he was again called by the Maple Leafs, where two days later, on January 14, he scored his first career NHL goal in a 4–0 victory over the Philadelphia Flyers. Bozak had his first career two-goal game on January 1, 2011, against the Ottawa Senators as part of a 5–1 win. In the following off-season, on July 5, he then agreed to terms on a two-year contract extension with the Maple Leafs. On July 5, 2013, he signed a five-year, $21 million contract extension with Toronto.

On March 28, 2015, towards the conclusion of the 2014–15 season, Bozak scored his first career NHL hat-trick, as well as recording one assist to cap off a four-point performance, contributing to all four Toronto goals. Bozak would finish the season with a career-high 23 goals while tying his career-high of 49 total points. During the season, future superstar Connor McDavid, who was drafted in June 2015, stated that Bozak was his most comparable player due to the centre's good skating and "pass first" mentality.

The 2015 off-season saw the Maple Leafs trade away star winger Phil Kessel to the Pittsburgh Penguins. Bozak had spent much of his NHL career playing on a line with Kessel, and many fans and media outlets predicted that Bozak's offensive production would decline significantly in his absence, with some even saying Bozak's point totals would resemble bottom line players (Bozak had spent most of his career on Toronto's top line). To the surprise of many, Bozak experienced career years following Kessel's departure, scoring at a pace much higher than predicted, and remaining on Toronto's top two lines. In an ironic turn of events, both Bozak and James van Riemsdyk (who also shared top line duties since joining the team) had more points and better analytics than Kessel at the Christmas break. After the holiday hiatus concluded, Bozak was named one of the NHL's three stars of the week for the period of December 21–28. Bozak had five points in this three-game span, also scoring his second career hat-trick en route in a 7–4 win over the Avalanche on December 21. The following season, 2016–17, Bozak scored a career-high 55 points on a line with van Riemsdyk and rookie Mitch Marner, helping the team make the playoffs for the second time in his career.

St. Louis Blues
After nine seasons with the Maple Leafs, Bozak left the club as a free agent, signing a three-year, $15 million contract with the St. Louis Blues on July 1, 2018. Bozak won a Stanley Cup with the Blues on June 12, 2019.

On September 14, 2021, Bozak re-signed with the Blues on a one-year, $750,000 contract.

Personal life
Bozak's parents are Mitch and Karon, and he has one brother, Justin. He graduated from Sheldon-Williams Collegiate in Regina, Saskatchewan.  While in high school, he volunteered for the Raise a Reader program and was on the honour roll all three years. While at the University of Denver, Bozak majored in Business.

Bozak is a Ukrainian-Canadian.

Bozak is married to Molly Robinson. The couple were married on July 22, 2017, and have three children together.

Career statistics

Awards

Junior

NCAA

NHL

Notes

References

External links
 

1986 births
Living people
Canadian ice hockey centres
Canadian people of Ukrainian descent
Denver Pioneers men's ice hockey players
Ice hockey people from Saskatchewan
Sportspeople from Regina, Saskatchewan
St. Louis Blues players
Stanley Cup champions
Toronto Maple Leafs players
Toronto Marlies players
Undrafted National Hockey League players
Victoria Grizzlies players
Victoria Salsa players